ACEN is the listed energy platform of the Ayala Group. The company has ~4,000 MW of attributable capacity in the Philippines, Vietnam, Indonesia, India, and Australia, with a renewable share of 98%, which is among the highest in the region.

ACEN’s aspiration is to be the largest listed renewables platform in Southeast Asia, with a goal of reaching 20 GW of renewables capacity by 2030. ACEN is committed to transition the company’s generation portfolio to 100% renewable energy by 2025 and to become a Net Zero greenhouse gas emissions company by 2050.

History

In 2011, ACEN made initial investments in the power sector in the Philippines—an investment in a wind farm at Ilocos Norte with a net capacity of 52MW (Northwind Project), a stake in a CFB thermal power plant in Batangas province with two 122MW capacity (SLTEC), a second wind farm in Ilocos Norte with net capacity of 81MW (North Luzon Renewables), a limited partnership in a coal-fired plant at Bataan and Lanao del Norte with a capacity of two 316MW (GNPower Mariveles) and four 138MW (GNPower Kauswagan) respectively, and a limited partnership in two 668MW supercritical coal-fired power plant also in Bataan (GNPower Dinginin).

In 2015, it invested in the development, construction and operation of a solar power farm in Bais, Negros Oriental or the Montesol project.

In September 2016, ACEN obtained a Retail Electricity Supplier's (RES) license, allowing to sell electricity to end-users in contestable market. It has entered into different agreements with various customers and end-users for the supply of over 100MW.

ACEN started to invest in different countries in the Asia-Pacific region.

In Indonesia in year 2017, established its first footprint outside the Philippines in renewable energy projects with consortium of Star Energy group and Thailand's Electricity Generating Company (EGCO) which acquired the Salak and Darajat geothermal projects in West Java, Indonesia with combined capacity of 637MW of steam and power. A year after, in 2018, the Sidrap wind project is AC Energy's first greenfield project offshore and is the first utility-scale wind farm in Indonesia with net capacity of 75MW.

In December 2017 at Vietnam, entered into a joint venture with AMI Renewables Energy for New Energy Investments Corporation for investments with Khanh Hoa Solar Power Plant with 50MW of capacity in Khanh Hoa, BMT Dak Lak solar farm with 30MW capacity in Dak Lak province, and in B&T Windfarm which entered into an agreement with Quang Binh province for the development of up to 200MW wind farm. The Khanh Hoa and Dak Lak solar farms were inaugurated in May and April 2019, respectively.

In April 2018, with Jetfly Asia, entered into an agreement for acquisition of the 25 percent interest in The Blue Circle as well as co-investment rights in its projects in Southeast Asia.

In May 2018, entered the Australian renewable energy market through a joint venture with UPC Renewables. Through its international subsidiary, invested US$30 million for 50 percent ownership in UPC-AC Energy Renewables Australia. ACEN also extended a US$200 million revolver facility to partially fund Australian projects including the New England Solar Farm in Uralla, New South Wales with expected net capacity to 700MW. UPC-AC Energy Renewables Australia is also developing wind farms on Robbins Island nd Jim's Plain, North West Tasmania with targeted net capacity of up to 1,000MW.

In June 2018, entered a partnership with the BIM Group of Vietnam for the development of an aggregate of 330MW of solar power plants located in the province of Ninh Thuan.

In May 2019, in partnership with The Blue Circle, jointly construct, own and operate the Mui Ne Wind Farm located at Binh Thuan province of Vietnam—first phase of construction for 40MW with potential expansion of up to 170MW capacity.

In June 2019, completed the acquisition of a 51.48 percent stake in PHINMA Energy with its purchase of secondary shares, growing to 66.34 percent of ownership. PHINMA Energy was renamed as AC Energy Philippines.

In November 2019, partnered with Yoma Strategic for a joint venture with Yoma Micro Power to develop around 200MW of additional renewable energy projects within Myanmar including participation in large utility scale renewable projects.

Energy Projects and Affiliates

AC Energy have business entities that carry out operations of power generation in renewable and thermal energies. It has grown from a Philippine-based investment to international ventures in the Asia-Pacific region.

AC Energy Inc

AC Energy Philippines, formerly PHINMA Energy Corporation and Trans-Asia Oil and Mineral Development Corporation, is a publicly listed company of AC Energy. It is a pioneer in electricity supply and trading in the Wholesale Electricity Spot Market (WESM). It is engaged in resource exploration and development of oil and gas, through ACE Enexor (formerly PHINMA Petroleum and Geothermal), and on renewable energy of wind and solar power.

Renewables Philippines

North Luzon Renewables owns and operates an 81 MW wind farm in Pagudpud, Ilocos Norte. The plant started its commercial operations in November 2014. The wind farm uses 27 units wind turbines with 3MW installed capacity.

Northwind Power owns and operates a 52 MW wind farm in Bangui Bay, Ilocos Norte. Phase I consists of 15 wind turbines; Phase II was completed in August 2008 and added five more wind turbines increasing the capacity to 33 MW. Six wind turbines with a capacity of 19 MW were added in 2014 as NorthWind Power's third phase, bringing its total capacity to 52 MW.

Monte Solar Energy Inc. (MonteSol) is a wholly owned subsidiary and started its full commercial operations in February 2016 with 18MW solar farm and serves the power requirements of Bais, Dumaguete and Cebu. The solar farm uses 67,920 modules of solar panels and 17 units of inverters.

San Carlos Solar Energy (SaCaSol) solar farm is the Philippines’ first utility-scale solar farm that began construction in September 2013 and currently delivers about 70 million kW hours to the grid. AC Energy only has 4 percent stake with SacaSol. The project is located on a total of 70-hectare property within San Carlos Ecozone in San Carlos City, Negros Occidental.

Negros Island Solar Power Inc. (IslaSol) is a special purpose vehicle composed of the second and third solar power plants built by clean energy developers, Visayas Renewables Corp. (AC Energy Devco) and Macquarie Infrastructure and Real Assets' PINAI Fund. The utility-scale solar farms are located on the island of Negros and carry a total capacity of 80 MWp—in La Carlota (Phase 1 and 2), and in Manapla (Phase 3). AC Energy has an economic stake of 2 percent in IslaSol. It supplies approximately 200,000 homes with electricity generated from 302,136 solar modules and 77 inverters.

Renewables International

UPC\AC Renewables Australia is a venture in Australia with an investment of US$30 million for 50% ownership of UPC Renewables. It is developing the 1,000MW Robins Island and Jims Plains projects in North West Tasmania and the 600MW New England Solar Farm located near Uralla, New South Wales. It has an additional development of another 3,000MW located in New South Wales, Tasmania and Victoria.

The Blue Circle is acquired by with 25% ownership, as well as a co-investment rights. It is Singapore-based company and a developer of wind energy projects in Southeast Asia.

Salak and Darajat Geothermal Plants in Indonesia have a combined capacity of 235MW equivalent of steam and 402 MW of electricity for a total of 637 net capacity. It is being operated by Star Energy Geothermal (Salak-Darajat), with AC Energy's stake at 20 percent.

Sidrap Wind Farm project is a 75MW wind farm in South Sulawesi, Indonesia. It is the first greenfield investment of AC Energy outside the Philippines. The project started in 2016 and was commenced commercial operations in March 2018 as the first utility-scale wind farm project in Indonesia.

Ninh Thuan Solar is operated under BIM\AC Renewables, a joint venture with BIM Group of Vietnam. Ninh Thuan Solar farm has a capacity of 330MW and it is one of the largest solar farms in Southeast Asia. The project was inaugurated and began operations in April 2019.

Khanh Hoa & Dak Lak Solar is a joint venture with AMI Renewables under AMI\AC Renewables. It composed of solar plants with a combined capacity of 80MW in the provinces of Khanh Hoa and Dak Lak, Vietnam. It is inaugurated and energized in April 2019.

Mui Ne Wind Farm is a partnership with The Blue Circle and is located in Binh Thuan province, Vietnam. It will have a capacity of 40MW in the first phase of construction up to 170MW.

Thermal Energy

South Luzon Thermal Energy Corp. (SLTEC) is a joint venture of AC Energy, PHINMA Energy (now AC Energy Philippines), and Marubeni Corporation's Axia Power Holdings Philippines Corporation. Commercial operations for the first unit of the 2 x 122 MW Circulating Fluidized Bed thermal plant started in April 2015, while the second unit was completed in February 2016. SLTEC operates as a baseload plant to meet the power demand in Luzon.

GNPower Kauswagan is a partnership with the Philippine Investment Alliance for Infrastructure Fund and Power Partners. The plant's construction become fully operational in 2019. The 552 MW plant operate as a baseload plant to support the power demand and economic development of Mindanao. The plant is a 4 x 138 MW, Pulverized Coal Combustion thermal plant with Shanghai boilers and Siemens turbines and generators.

GNPower Mariveles Coal Plant, a component of AC Energy's AA Thermal platform, is a partnership of AC Energy, AboitizPower subsidiary Therma Power and Power Partners. The 632-MW power plant started commercial operations in February 2014 and has since been providing competitively priced baseload power to several distribution utilities.

GNPower Dinginin is a constituent of AC Energy's AA Thermal platform, is a joint venture with AboitizPower subsidiary Therma Power and Power Partners. The construction of the first unit is in full swing and is scheduled for completion by 2020. In May 2019, AC Energy completed the partial sale of its AA Thermal platform to AboitizPower. AA Thermal has ownership interest in the GNPower Mariveles and GNPower Dinginin power plants.

References 

Ayala Corporation subsidiaries
Companies listed on the Philippine Stock Exchange